Sóskút is a village in Pest County, Hungary.

History

Media
Several scenes of the movies John Adams (2008) and Move On (2012) were shot in the town.

Residents
 Georg von Habsburg (1964-), the grandson of Blessed Charles of Austria, the last Austro-Hungarian emperor.

Economy
There are several companies active in the industrial park of the village.
 Aerometal Kft.
 Avarem Kft.
 Bajér Építőipari Kft. - materials for house construction
 ByCom Ltd.
 Durostone Kft. ipari padlók
 Kerox Kft.
 Majoros.hu Kft. - installation of sewage treatment plants
 Mapei Kft. - Hungarian subsidiary of the Mapei company
 MÁVIPROD Magyarország Kft.
 Mazak Hungary - Hungarian subsidiary of the Yamazaki Mazak Corporation
 Motip Dupli Hungária Kft.
 Nicro Kft. - developer and manufacturerer of materials for the mounting of special lubricants, adhesives, sealants, corrosion protection against a multitude of chemicals and for the maintenance of all branches of industry and transport.
 Omega Auto Center Kft.
 Orion Electronics has a manufacturer facility and brand shop
 Ózon-Sóskút Kft
 Sóskúti Inerthulladék-lerakó -inert landfill
 Prem-x Kft. - dry mortar mixing plant
 Pro-Hand Hungaria Kft.
 Sipospack Reklám- és Csomagolóanyag Gyártó Kft. - advertising and packaging manufacturer
 SB-Controls Kereskedelmi és Műszaki Szolgáltató Kft. - commercial and technical services
 SKT Trade Kft.
 SkyShield Magyarország Kft.
 Stefinox Kft - production of gastronomical accessories
 Szenzortechnika Kft - production of gasdetectors
 Techno-Trade Kft. - distribution, merchandise, logistics
 Téta Kft. - distributor of tampon ink, consumables for printing, repro machines prepress and film materials
 Ulbrich Kft. - power-operated hydraulic service, assembly of presses and test presses for positioning and monitoring.
 Yamazaki Mazak kft. - Hungarian branch of Yamazaki Mazak Central Europe S. R. O.

References

Populated places in Pest County